Dr. Philip Jameson (born December 7, 1941 in Wooster, Ohio) graduated from Wooster High School in 1959 and attended Baldwin Wallace College for one year.

Education
In the Fall of 1960 he was accepted by audition to The Juilliard School of Music on a full scholarship. He was subsequently appointed principal trombone with the Juilliard Orchestra, a position he held for the next five years. He graduated from Juilliard with a Bachelor of Music Degree in 1964 and a Master of Science degree in 1965. He then enrolled in Columbia University (NYC) and received a Master of Music Education Degree in 1967 and completed his Doctorate of Music in 1980. His PhD dissertation was entitled "The effect of timbre conditions on the prompted and simultaneous pitch matching of three ability groups of trombone performers". It is available from Dissertation Abstracts.

Career
Dr. Jameson was the professor of trombone and music at the University of Georgia, where he founded the UGA Brass Quintet and the UGA Trombone Choir in the fall of 1967 to the spring of 2009, retiring as Distinguished Professor Emeritus. He is a lifetime member of the International Trombone Association and has had numerous articles published in the ITA Journal. Dr. Jameson is listed in The International Who's Who in Music, Fifteenth Edition, International Biographical Center, Cambridge, England, and Who's Who in American Music. Former students have earned places in major performing organizations across the world. During his tenure at the University of Georgia, former students substituted in orchestras ranging from the New York Philharmonic to the San Francisco Symphony. Dr. Jameson has been a significant teacher in the world of trombone.

He was a charter member of Leopold Stokowski's American Symphony Orchestra at Carnegie Hall and the Mostly Mozart Orchestra at New York's Lincoln Center.  He has also performed with the New York City Ballet, the Band of America, the Musica Aeterna Orchestra at the Metropolitan Museum of Art, the Radio City Music Hall Orchestra, and the American Wind Symphony Orchestra. He was a Fromm Foundation Fellow with the Boston Symphony Orchestra at Tanglewood, the recipient of the Juilliard School Naumburg Prize, the Sarah Moss Fellowship for doctoral study at Columbia University, and a Senior Fulbright Professorship with the National Symphony Orchestra of Korea. While on sabbaticals, he held teaching appointments at the Juilliard School, the Horace Mann School, the Queensland Conservatorium of Music(Australia), and Seoul National University.  He was actively engaged in acoustical research, and presented many papers in this area at national symposiums.

In 2005 trombone students of Dr. Jameson at the University of Georgia won three major trombone solo competitions in the USA.  David Nelson won first place in the US Army/ Eastern Trombone Workshop National Solo Competition in Washington D.C. Charles Reneau won first place at the International Trombone Association Solo Competition in New Orleans and the Zellmer International Trombone Competition Sponsored by the Minnesota Symphony Orchestra. Two of the four current trombonists with the New York Philharmonic, James Markey and Amanda Stewart Davidson, were students of his at the Interlochen Arts Camp, where he taught from 1984 to 2004. Other students who have studied with Dr. Jameson at the University of Georgia have attained professional positions with the major orchestras including: the St. Louis Symphony, Gerry Pagano; the Oregon Symphony Orchestra, Charles Reneau; and Steve Norrell of the Metropolitan Opera Orchestra.

The University of Georgia Trombone Choir
Dr. Jameson is the founder (1967) of the University of Georgia Trombone Choir.  Under Dr. Jameson's direction, his trombone students form the University of Georgia Trombone Choir, one of the longest-standing premier trombone ensembles in the United States.  In recognition of his teaching excellence and musical direction, the trombone choir has received regular invitations to perform at both National and International conferences, several of which are listed below.

13 Invited Ensemble Performances at the International Trombone
Association's Eastern Trombone Workshop, 1975 -  2007.
U.S. Army Band, Washington, D.C., 1992–2002, yearly.
U.S. Navy Band, Washington, D.C., 1984.
University of Miami, 1983.
Florida State University, 1982.
Florida State University, 1981.
Townsend State University, 1979.
Townsend State University, 1975.

Invited Ensemble Performances, Georgia Music
Educators’ Convention, Savannah, GA. 2002, 2001, 2000
1999,1998,1986,1985, 1982, 1978
Invited Ensemble Performance Southern Division Music Educators
National Conference, Savannah, Georgia, 2003

Former private applied trombone teachers 1956–1967
Jack Emig, former member of US Navy Band.  High School band director, Wooster Ohio.  1955–1957
Robert Paolucci, former first trombone CBS Symphony and retired teacher,  Akron, Ohio.  1957–1959
Charles Gorham, brass instructor Baldwin-Wallace College, Berea Ohio.  1959–1960
Robert Boyd, principal trombone Cleveland Symphony Orchestra, Summer 1960
Davis Shuman, trombone professor Juilliard School of Music. 1960
Roger Smith, trombone professor Juilliard School of Music, 1960–1965
William Gibson, principal trombone Boston Symphony Orchestra, Tanglewood. Summer 1962
Lewis Van Haney, second trombone New York Philharmonic, National Orchestral Association. 1961–1964
Alan Ostrander, bass trombone New York Philharmonic, professor Columbia University. 1965–1967
Gordon Pulis, former principal trombone New York Philharmonic Chamber Music coach. 1965–1967

Performance and creative activities as trombonist/conductor

As a founding member of the UGA Brass Quintet (1967), many of Dr. Jameson's performances were with that group.  The highlights of the UGA Brass Quintet's international performances have been their 1987-month-long concert tour of the Pacific Rim, 1990 tour of Finland, and their 1998 Concert tour to Narbonne France.  Listed below are other significant performances and clinics.

International performances
Director of UGA Trombone Choir Concert at the 2002 International Trombone Association's Eastern Trombone Workshop, sponsored by the US Army Band, Washington D.C., March 2002. This program slot was shared with the Juilliard Trombone Choir, directed by Joseph Alessi, Principal Trombone of the New York Philharmonic.  Former UGA trombone student and current Metropolitan Opera Member, Steve Norrell, was the UGA Trombone Choir's guest soloist. This concert marked the 13th invited appearance of the UGA Trombone choir at this international event.
Invited workshop presentation for the 2004 Trombonanza in Argentina
International Brass Quintet Competition and Festival sponsored by UGA Brass Department, March 1999 and 2001
Georgia Brass, several concerts at the 1998 Narbonne (France) International Brass Quintet Competition as part of the 15 member Georgia Brass, May, 1998.
Georgia Brass Quintet Concert, King Sejong Hotel, Seoul, Korea, Spring 1987.
Georgia Brass Quintet Concert, Seoul Arts Academy, Seoul, Korea, Spring, 1987.
Georgia Brass Quintet Concert, Yu Kwan Sun Memorial Hall, Seoul, Korea, Spring 1987.
Georgia Brass Quintet Concert, Seoul Union Church, Seoul, Korea, Spring 1987.
Georgia Brass Quintet Concert, Seoul Foreign School, Seoul, Korea, Spring 1987.
Clinic, “Instructional Models for the Trombonist,” for Korean Trombone Association, Seoul, Korea, Spring 1987.
Georgia Brass Quintet Concert, Inca Olympus Hotel, Inchon, Korea, Spring 1987.
Georgia Brass Quintet Concert, Korean Broadcasting System taping for broadcast, Seoul, Korea, Spring 1987.
Georgia Brass Quintet Concert, Healien Cultural Center, Healien, Taiwan, Spring 1987.
Georgia Brass Quintet Concert, Taichung Cultural Center, Taichung, Taiwan, Spring 1987.
Georgia Brass Quintet Concert, Changhwa Ta Tung Junior Middle School, Chungwa, Taiwan, Spring 1987.
Georgia Brass Quintet Concert, Kaoshing Hugh School of Music, Kaoshing, Taiwan, Spring 1987.
Georgia Brass Quintet Concert, Nantou Cultural Center, Nantou, Taiwan, Spring 1987.
Georgia Brass Quintet Concert, Taipei Shih-Chen Hall, Taipei, Taiwan, Spring 1987
Clinic, “Instructional Models for the Trombonist,” for college and professional trombonists in Taipei, Taiwan, Spring 1987.
Georgia Brass Quintet Concert, Hong Kong International School, Hong Kong, Spring 1987.
Georgia Brass Quintet Concert, Shanghai Conservatory of Music, Shanghai, People's Republic of China, Spring 1987.
Georgia Brass Quintet Concert II, Shanghai Conservatory of Music, Shanghai, People's Republic of China, Spring 1987.
Georgia Brass Quintet Concert, American Consulate, Shanghai, People's Republic of China, Spring 1987.
Georgia Brass Quintet Concert, Australian Consulate, Shanghai, People's Republic of China, Spring 1987.
Georgia Brass Quintet Performances (2), Convocations of the University of New Brunswick, Canada, Fall 1985.
Georgia Brass Quintet Concert, University of New Brunswick, Fredericton, New Brunswick, Canada, Fall 1985.
Georgia Brass Quintet Concert, University of New Brunswick, Saint John, New Brunswick, Canada, Fall 1985.

Additional performance activities

Member of the Canton and Akron Symphony Orchestras, Louis Lane, conductor, 1957-1959
Charter member of the Ohio Light Opera Company, Wooster Ohio
Member of the New Jersey Wind Symphony- Kieth Brian, conductor  
Member of the New Sousa Band- Kieth Brian, conductor 
Member of the Jimmy Sturr Polka Band at Madison Square Garden
Member of the National Orchestral Association, NYC 1960-1962
Performance with Louis Armstrong's Band, Washington D.C. 1962

Honors received for academic/music achievement
Charter recipient of the first Fine Arts Hall of Fame award presented by the city of Wooster, Ohio. The other charter inductees were Jack Perkins (CBS news), Philip Giffin (Hollywood composer), and Cabot Rey (Director of Ohio light Opera), 2006.
Omicron Delta Kappa, 1960
Pi Kappa Lambda, 1971
Phi Mu Alpha, 1969
Alpha Tau Omega, 1960
International Trombone Association, life member, 1975
Music Educators National Conference, 1965
Interlochen Center for the Arts,  Alumni Board of Directors, 1990–1996
Orpheus Award, Phi Mu Alpha Sinfonia fraternity, Epsilon Lambda chapter April 25, 2009
Classic City Band

Notes

References
 The International Who's Who in Music, Fifteenth Edition. International Biographical Center, Cambridge England, 1996.

Printed sources
 Who's Who in American Music, Edited by J. C. Press : R.R. Bowker Co. N.Y., London, Classical, Second Edition, 1995.
 Who's Who in America, published by Marquis, New Providence, NJ 59th &  60th editions, 2004 & 2006.
 Appointed by Department of State as Visiting Fulbright Professor of Music to National Symphony Orchestra of Korea and Seoul National University, 1978.
 National Artist of Merit Award, Korean Ministry of Culture, 1978.
 Appointed Voting Member, National Academy of Recording Arts and Sciences (NARAS/Grammy Awards), 1975.
 Moss Foundation Fellowship for Graduate Study at Columbia University, 1973 and 1974.
 Sarah and Walter Naumburg Award for Graduate Study at the Juilliard School of Music, 1964-65.
 Fromm Foundation Fellowship Award, Tanglewood Festival Orchestra, 1962. Recording Industries Trust Fund Award, American Federation of Musicians, American Wind Symphony Orchestra, 1961.

1941 births
20th-century American male musicians
20th-century classical trombonists
21st-century American male musicians
21st-century classical trombonists
American classical trombonists
Living people
Male trombonists